Zhang Zongye (born 29 January 1935) is a Chinese nuclear physicist. She is a research professor at the Institute of High Energy Physics and an academician of the Chinese Academy of Sciences (CAS).

Biography
Zhang was born in Yenching University, Beijing, on January 29, 1935, to Zhang Dongsun, a philosopher and social activist, and Wu Shaohong. Her eldest brother Zhang Zongbing was an entomologist. Her second eldest brother Zhang Zongsui was a physicist. Her third elder brother Zhang Zongying is also a physicist. Her ancestral home is in Hangzhou, Zhejiang. 

In September 1949 she attended the Beiman Girls' School (now Beijing No. 166 High School). In September 1952 she was accepted to Peking University, where she majored in physics. 

After university, she was assigned to the Institute of High Energy Physics, Chinese Academy of Sciences as an assistant research fellow. In 1984 she conducted research at the University of Tübingen in West Germany. She was elected an academician of the Chinese Academy of Sciences (CAS) in 1999.

References

1935 births
Living people
Chinese nuclear physicists
Chinese women physicists
Members of the Chinese Academy of Sciences
Peking University alumni
Physicists from Beijing